Kandam Becha Kottu is a 1961 Indian Malayalam-language drama film directed and produced by T. R. Sundaram under the banner of Modern Theatres. It stars Thikkurissy Sukumaran Nair and Prem Nawas in the lead roles, along with T. S. Muthaiah, Aranmula Ponnamma and Ambika Sukumaran in supporting roles. The film deals with the negative effects of the dowry system in India through customs of the Muslim community.

Kandam Becha Kottu was based on a popular novel by T. Muhammad Yusuf, which was also staged as a play under the same title by the Kerala People's Arts Club. Sundaram had earlier produced and directed Malayalam cinema's first talkie Balan (1938). The film was initially planned to be K. S. Sethumadhavan's directorial debut. However, when Sundaram decided to shoot the film in colour, which would be much more expensive than planned, he decided to direct the film himself. The screenplay of the film was written by K. T. Muhammed in the Kozhikodan dialect. The film's music was composed by M. S. Baburaj, while the cinematography was done by T. Sundarababu.

Kandam Becha Kottu was released on 24 August 1961 to high expectations. The film was the first colour film and Eastmancolor film in Malayalam. The film was a huge box office success, running for weeks in packed theatres. The film received the Certificate of Merit for Second Best Feature Film in Malayalam at the 9th National Film Awards.

Plot
The story of the film revolves around a kind-hearted cobbler Mohammed Kakka (T. S. Muthiah). He keeps his life savings in the pockets of his old coat to realise his dream of going on a pilgrimage to Mecca. Alikoya Haji (Thikkurissi) loves his son Ummer (Prem Nawaz) and brings him up showering all love and affection. Hajis's sister Kadeeja (Pankajavalli) and her family lives in the neighbourhood. Amina (Aranmula Ponnamma) and her children, Kunju Bibi (Ambika) and Hassan (Nellikkodu Bhaskaran) live in the same house. Amina's husband is a businessman in Singapore. Kadeeja's husband Avaran (Kedamangalam Sadanandan) is very considerate to his brother's wife Amina and her family. But Kadeeja keeps ill-treating Amina.

Ummer falls in love with Kunju Bibi, his childhood mate. Kadeeja is jealous of this affair. She tries all sorts of tricks to create trouble, but fails. Alikoya Haji decides to accept Kunju Bibi as his daughter-in-law, but demands a dowry of Rs. 2,000.

Amina's husband starts from Singapore with the money. Arrangements for the wedding is made, but to the dismay of everyone, a telegram arrives informing the death of Amina's husband during the voyage back home. Amina and her children are pushed out of the house, the marriage is postponed as Haji gives an ultimatum to organise the dowry.

Mohammed Kakka gives shelter to Amina and her family. Kadeeja continues to harass them, while Ummer tries hard to help them organise the money. He even goes to the extent of stealing from his father's safe. Ummer is caught red handed and is placed under house arrest. Mohammed Kakka makes arrangements for the marriage. He offers the money he had saved and kept in the pockets of the coat. He also appeals to others in the neighbourhood to contribute for the marriage. Ummer finally marries Kunju Bibi, providing a happy ending to the film. Mohmmed Kakka's noble deed glorifies him.

Cast

Thikkurissy Sukumaran Nair  as Alikoya Haji
Prem Nawas  as Ummer
T. S. Muthaiah as Mammadikka
Ambika Sukumaran as Kunju Bivi
Pankajavalli as Kadeeja
Aranmula Ponnamma as Amina
Nellikode Bhaskaran  as Hassan
Kedamangalam Sadanandan as Avaran
S. P. Pillai as Minnal Moideen
Bahadoor as Khader
Nilambur Ayisha as Bethatha
Chandni as Beechipathu
Kottayam Chellappan
Omana
Muttathara Soman

Crew

 director       - T. R. Sundaram
 producer       - Modern Theatres
 writer         - K. T. Muhammed -T. Muhammad Yusuf
 music          - Baburaj
 Art Direction  - A.J.Dominic

Soundtrack 
The music was composed by M. S. Baburaj and lyrics were written by P. Bhaskaran.

Reception
The film was a big box office success and ran for weeks in packed theatres.

Awards
National Film Awards
 1961: Certificate of Merit for Second Best Feature Film in Malayalam

References

External links
 
http://www.malayalachalachithram.com/movie.php?i=89
 Deshabhimani article on the Golden Jubilee of the film
 Madhyamam article on the Golden Jubilee of the film

1961 films
1960s Malayalam-language films
1961 directorial debut films